The 2013 Big Easy Tour was the third season of the Big Easy Tour.

Schedule
The following table lists official events during the 2013 season.

Order of Merit
The Order of Merit was based on prize money won during the season, calculated in South African rand. The top five players on the tour earned status to play on the 2014 Sunshine Tour.

Notes

References

2013 in golf
2013 in South African sport